Glipa hieroglyphica is a species of beetle in the genus Glipa. It was described in 1878.

References

hieroglyphica
Beetles described in 1878